Steal Kisses (TC: 偷吻) is a Cantopop album by Edmond Leung.

Track listing
Ends of the Earth: West of the Sun (天涯:太陽之西)
Angle (角度)
The Men in the Closet (衣櫃裡的男人)
A Genuine Person (性情中人)
My Wish (我的志願)
After Love (戀後)
Splendid and Fallen (燦爛與墮落)
Mistake (破綻)
Ends of the Earth: South of the Border (海角:國境之南)
Be reluctant to part (依依)

Charts

References

Edmond Leung albums
1997 albums